Gisburn is a civil parish in Ribble Valley, Lancashire, England.  It contains 26 listed buildings that are recorded in the National Heritage List for England.  Of these, one is listed at Grade I, the highest of the three grades, two are at Grade II*, the middle grade, and the others are at Grade II, the lowest grade.  The parish contains the village of Gisburn and surrounding countryside.  The most important building in the parish is the country house Gisburne Park; this and structures associated with it are listed.  Many of the other listed buildings are houses (or originated as houses), farmhouses, and farm buildings.  The rest of the listed buildings include a church, hotels, public houses, railway tunnel entrances, former dog kennels, bridges, and a milestone.

Key

Buildings

Notes and references

Notes

Citations

Sources

Lists of listed buildings in Lancashire
Buildings and structures in Ribble Valley